Zanthoxylum riedelianum is a species of the plant in the genus Zanthoxylum in the family Rutaceae. The native range of this species is Mexico to South America.

Benefits 
Zanthoxylum has been used worldwide to treat different conditions such as snakebites, stomach problems, skin lesions, inflammation, and parasitic diseases.

References 

riedelianum